Tmoriq was a region in southern Armenia,  300–800.

See also
List of regions of ancient Armenia

References

Early medieval Armenian regions